Bartholomew L. Cantz (January 29, 1860 – February 12, 1943) was an American catcher in Major League Baseball.

Born in Philadelphia, Pennsylvania, Cantz started his professional baseball career in 1884, playing for Chambersburg and Littlestown of the Keystone Association.  He played for the Long Island A's and Bridgeport Giants of the Eastern League in 1886.  In 1887, he moved to the Newark Little Giants of the International Association.

In 1888, Cantz played for the St. Louis Whites of the Western Association and then was transferred to the American Association's Baltimore Orioles. He appeared in 57 games for the Orioles in 1888–1889. The following year he played with the Philadelphia Athletics, where he appeared in only five games before retiring. In his three major league seasons, Cantz had a .157 batting average with 34 hits and 18 runs batted in.

External links

1860 births
1943 deaths
19th-century baseball players
Major League Baseball catchers
Baltimore Orioles (AA) players
Philadelphia Athletics (AA) players
Chambersburg (minor league baseball) players
Littlestown (minor league baseball) players
Bridgeport Giants players
St. Louis Whites players
Baseball players from Philadelphia